Al Ahly Football Club, commonly referred to as Al Ahly, is an Egyptian professional football club based in Cairo,
It is known as "The Club of the Century" in African football. It is best known for its professional football team that plays in the Egyptian Premier League, the top tier in the Egyptian football league system, and is the most decorated football club in Africa. It was founded on 24 April 1907, as a gathering place for Cairo's Student Unions.

Al Ahly has a record of 42 national league titles, 37 national cup titles, and 11 national super cup titles, making them the most decorated club in Egypt. In addition, Al Ahly has never been relegated to the Egyptian Second Division.
In international competitions, the club has won a record ten CAF Champions League titles, a CAF Confederation Cup, a record Seven CAF Super Cups, a record four African Cup Winners' Cups, an Afro-Asian Club Championship, an Arab Club Champions Cup, an Arab Cup Winners' Cup, a record two Arab Super Cups, and won a bronze medal in the 2006, 2020 and 2021 Club World Cup. Al Ahly is the second most successful club in the world behind only Glasgow Rangers.

Honours 
Al Ahly winning the 2021 CAF Super Cup (December) raised the club's trophy count to 143, making them the most decorated club in the world. This includes 24 continental titles. Al Ahly won the African Cup of Champions Clubs in 1982 and 1987. Following the tournament's rebranding as the CAF Champions League, Al Ahly triumphed again in 2001, 2005, 2006 and 2008 under the coaching of the Portuguese Manuel José, in 2012 under Hossam El-Badry, in 2013 under Mohamed Youssef, and in 2020 and 2021 under Pitso Mosimane. This makes them the most decorated team in continental competitions in Africa with ten Champions League titles, as well as one CAF Confederation Cup, four African Cup Winners' Cups, eight CAF Super Cups and one Afro-Asian Club Championship.
At local level, Al Ahly has won more titles than any other club, with 42 Egyptian Premier League titles, 37 Egypt Cups, 11 Egyptian Super Cups, 7 Sultan Hussein Cups and 16 Cairo League titles, along with winning the cup of the United Arab Republic on one occasion and the Egyptian Confederation Cup once as well.

Domestic (115 titles)

Africa (23 titles)

Worldwide (5 titles) 

 
  shared record

Awards & recognitions
 CAF Club of the 20th Century: 2001
 Globe soccer Top Titles Winners in the Middle East: 2020

All-time statistics
All stats correct as of 26 December 2021.

Players records
 Youngest first-team player: Ramadan Sobhi –  (against Ghazl El Mahalla SC, 2013–14 Egyptian Premier League, 6 February 2014)

Most appearances
Competitive, professional matches only. Goals (in parentheses) included in total.

Top goalscorers

All Competitions

League

Africa

Individual honours

Player of the season

Players' individual honours and awards while playing with Al Ahly
 African Footballer of the Year:
 Mahmoud El Khatib (1): 1983
 EFA Egyptian Player of the Year:
 Mohamed Aboutrika (4): 2005, 2006, 2007, 2008
 Egyptian Premier League top scorer:
 El-Dhizui (1): 1958–59
 Mahmoud El Khatib (2): 1977–78, 1980–81
 Mohamed Ramadan (1): 1990–91
 Hossam Hassan (1): 1998–99
 Ahmad Belal (1): 2002–03
 Emad Moteab (1): 2004–05
 Mohamed Aboutrika (1): 2005–06
 Flávio Amado (2): 2006–07, 2008–09
 Walid Azaro (1): 2017–18
 Mohamed Sherif (1): 2020–21
 African Inter-Club Player of the Year:
 Mohamed Aboutrika (4): 2006, 2008, 2012, 2013
 Mohamed Barakat (1): 2005
 Ahmed Hassan (1): 2010
 Mohamed El Shenawy (1): 2022 
CAF Team of the Tournament:
 Wael Gomaa (3): 2006 2008 2010
 Taher Abouzeid (2): 1984 1986
 Mohamed Aboutrika (2): 2006 2008
 Essam El Hadary (2): 2006 2008
 Mahmoud El Khatib (1): 1980
 Rabie Yassin (1):  1986
 Magdi Abdelghani (1):  1986
 Moustafa Abdou (1): 1986
 Ahmed Shobair (1): 1994
 Hossam Hassan (1): 1998
 Mohamed Emara (1): 1998
 Ahmed Fathy (1): 2010
 Ahmed Hassan (1): 2010
 Ahmed Hegazi (1): 2017
 Mohamed Abdelmonem (1): 2021
 CAF Team of the Year:
 Mahmoud El Khatib (1): 1980
 Mohamed Barakat (1): 2005
 Essam El Hadary (1): 2006
 Wael Gomaa      (4): 2005, 2008, 2009, 2010
 Mohamed Aboutrika (4): 2006, 2008, 2012, 2013
 Ahmed Hassan (1): 2010
 Ahmed Fathy (3): 2012, 2013, 2017
 Ali Maâloul (1): 2017
  Junior Ajayi (1): 2017
 BBC African Footballer of the Year:
 Mohamed Barakat (1): 2005
 Mohamed Aboutrika (1): 2008
 CAF Goalkeeper of the Year:
 Essam El Hadary (4): 2001, 2006, 2007, 2008
 FIFA Club World Cup Top Goalscorer:
 Mohamed Aboutrika (1): 2006

Team records

Matches

Firsts
 First Egyptian League match: Al Ahly 5–0 Greek Alexandria 24 October 1948.
 First Egypt Cup match: Al Ahly ? Nile FC, 1921-1922 Egypt Cup first round.
 First African match: MC Alger 3–0 Al Ahly, 1976 African Cup of Champions Clubs Second round.

Record wins

 Record league win: 8–0 against Ismaily, 1957–58 Egyptian League, 4 April 1958
 Record Cup win: 13–0 against El Gouna, 2014–15 Egypt Cup round of 16, 13 August 2015
 Record African win: 9–0 against Atlabara, 2019–20 CAF Champions League qualifying rounds, 23 August 2019

League

Points

 Most points in a season (record):
 89 points in the 2019–20 season (Egyptian League record).
  Highest Point Average (record):
 2.84 points during the 2004–05 season (Egyptian League Record).

Goals

 Season with most goals scored in League matches (record):
 75 goals scored in the 2017–18.
  Highest Goal Average Scored by a club in 1 season (record):
  3.06 in 1957–58 season (Egyptian League Record).
 Season with fewest goals conceded in League matches (record):
 The club conceded a total number of 2 goals in 23 games in the 1975–76 season.
  Lowest Goals Received Average by a season (record):
   0.09 in the 1975–76 season (Egyptian League Record).

Streaks
 Consecutive Egyptian League titles (record):
 Won 9 championship titles: 1948–49, 1949–50, 1950–51, 1952–53,1953–54, 1955–56, 1956–57, 1957–58, 1958–59 seasons.
 Longest consecutive unbeaten matches in the league (record):
 71 (between loss to Zamalek on 15 May 2004 and loss to Ismaily on 25 May 2007)
 Longest consecutive unbeaten matches in one league season (record):
 26 games during the 1974–75 season.

Record transfer fee paid

Record transfer fee received

See also 
 History of Al Ahly SC

References